Nikola Unkovich (15 January 1923 – 21 July 2005), generally known as Nick Unkovich, was a New Zealand international lawn bowler.

Early life and family
Unkovich was born in 1923 on the island of Korčula in present-day Croatia, and migrated to New Zealand with his parents in 1932, settling in Northland. In 1951, he married Joy Auld in Auckland, and the couple went on to have two children.

Bowls career
Unkovich started bowling at the Matamata Bowling Club, after moving to nearly Waharoa to establish a grocery business. He played for the Okahu Bay Bowling Club in Auckland from the mid 1970s, and then the Rawhiti Club in Remuera in later years.

He won a bronze medal in the triples at the 1980 World Outdoor Bowls Championship in Melbourne.

He won ten New Zealand National Bowls Championships titles, one singles (1979), one pairs (1991) with Ross Haresnape and eight fours titles between 1971 and 1986.

References

1923 births
2005 deaths
People from Korčula
Croatian emigrants to New Zealand
New Zealand male bowls players
20th-century New Zealand people
21st-century New Zealand people